Rex Leech is a fictional character in the DC Comics Universe. He first appeared in Adventures of Superman #502 in July 1993 and for a time was a regular supporting character in the Superboy line of comics.

Fictional character biography
Rex was first introduced after the 'Death of Superman'. During the actual funeral procession, Rex, backed up by two gun toting men, try to buy the rights to Jimmy Olsen's picture of Superman dead. Olsen punches Leech in the face. The promoter then has his goons threaten to shoot Jimmy in the knees. Robin stops the incident.

He was used by Vincent Edge of WGBS to recruit a supervillain for the new Superboy to fight (Vinnie was wanting higher rating on his television station).  In exchange, Rex would get to be the sole representative of Superboy. Superboy was reluctant to hire Rex as his manager, having already been offered a deal by Lex Luthor II, until he met Rex's daughter, Roxy Leech, who swooned all over the Kid. Rex managed to secure the exclusive rights to the name and symbol "Superman" and was not happy when the real Superman showed up alive and well and Superboy wanted to "sell" him his name and symbol. Rex made the deal, however, and in exchange the Kid got to officially use the symbol and name Superboy (on the condition that half of all the profits from any merchandising would go to charity). The money in question was initially quite a large sum, given Superboy's superstar status in the media.  

Rex then set up Superboy's World Tour. The Tour was cut short in Hawaii, where Superboy decided to stay, fashioning himself as the Hero of Hawaii. Rex pushed Superboy's merchandising as far as he could, even financing an animated series loosely based on the Kid. The series was not picked up because it was too violent. Rex blew a lot of the money on bad investments, and the Kid spent a great deal buying a ramshakle place in a remote area of Hawaii that he called "the Compound."  Unfortunately, this meant that Rex did not have the money to pay back a Mr. Gamboni, whom he owed a large sum, so Mr. Gamboni sent the assassin Copperhead after him.  Copperhead decided to spare Rex's life at the expense of his daughter's—but luckily, Superboy was on the scene and managed to save Roxy's life. Despite Rex's human status he becomes a valued member of the super-powered crowd at Guy Gardner's 'Warrior's bar.   

Rex Leech also became a favored friend of the non-powered canine Krypto and the sentient genetic life form Dubbilex.

Rex and Roxy move on with their lives when they incorrectly believe Superboy to be dead. Krypto is taken in by a family friend he adores.

Powers and abilities
Rex Leech is a shrewd businessman and a fast-talker. His talents lie in the areas of entertainment management, cross-promotion and copyright law.

References

External links
Rex Leech biography page at the Unofficial Guide to the DC Universe

Comics characters introduced in 1993
Characters created by Karl Kesel